Khalsa Diwan Sikh Temple is a Gurdwara in the Wan Chai District of Hong Kong, on the junction of Queen's Road East and Stubbs Road, Hong Kong Island. It was re-opened on 8 September 2022 by Hong Kong SAR Chief Executive, John Lee Ka-chiu, after a 5 year renovation project.

History
The Gurudwara was built in 1901 by local Sikhs, including soldiers from the British Army, with the intent of providing religious, social, practical and cohesive support to Sikhs in Hong Kong. Many Sikhs on their way to immigrate to Canada, in what later became the Komagata Maru incident, slept in the Gurudwara and prayed there before boarding the ship in 1914. In the 1930s, with an increase in the size of the local Sikh community, the Gurudwara was extended and rebuilt. It was bombed twice during World War II, suffering extensive damage that killed the Gurudwara Granthi, Bhai Nand Singh. The damaged parts of the Gurudwara were rebuilt after the war by the community, with the assistance of Sindhi Hindus who immigrated to Hong Kong in large numbers due to the Partition. The Gurudwara was again extended in the 1980s, and linked to Queens' Road East by a covered bridge, which provides easy access for the devotees.

See also
Indians in Hong Kong
South Asians in Hong Kong
Battle of Hong Kong

References

External links

Official website

Queen's Road East
Gurdwaras in Hong Kong
Happy Valley, Hong Kong
Monuments and memorials in Hong Kong
Grade III historic buildings in Hong Kong
Sikh places
20th-century gurdwaras